Kirsipuu is a common surname in Estonia (meaning cherrytree), and may refer to:
 (1897–1984), architect
Jaan Kirsipuu (born 1969), road bicycle racer
 (born 1957), sculptor
Nele Kirsipuu (born 1990), singer (:et)
Valve Kirsipuu (born 1933), economist and politician

Estonian-language surnames